The 2022–23 Siena Saints men's basketball team represented Siena College in the 2022–23 NCAA Division I men's basketball season. The Saints, led by fourth-year head coach Carmen Maciariello, played their home games at MVP Arena in Albany, New York as members of the Metro Atlantic Athletic Conference.

Previous season
The Saints finished the 2021–22 season 15–14, 12–8 in MAAC play to finish in third place. As the No. 3 seed, they were upset by No. 11 seed Quinnipiac in the quarterfinals of the MAAC tournament.

Roster

Schedule and results

|-
!colspan=12 style=| Regular season

|-
!colspan=12 style=| MAAC tournament

Sources

References

Siena Saints men's basketball seasons
Siena Saints
Siena Saints men's basketball
Siena Saints men's basketball